Manitoba Public Insurance Corporation (MPI) is the non-profit Crown corporation which administers public auto insurance, motor vehicle registration, and driver licensing in Manitoba. Established by the Government of Manitoba in 1971, it is headquartered in the provincial capital Winnipeg.

MPI has 21 claim centres, two customer service centres in 13 locations across Manitoba. Driver and Vehicle Licensing (DVL) is available through 147 agents in 123 communities, including 100 photo licensing agencies, and mobile testing units that service 69 communities. MPI partners with more than 300 independent insurance brokers in Manitoba.

As of fall 2014, MPI offers a Winter Tire Financing Program that allows policy holders to finance new Winter Tires and Rims (along with other approved services) up to a maximum of $2,000.00 for a repayment period of one to four years.

Autopac
The basic automobile insurance product offered by MPI is known more informally as Autopac. Basic automobile insurance is compulsory in Manitoba and is only available through MPI. Extension insurance products (lower deductibles, increased insurance coverage, etc.) are sold in competition with the private sector.

In 2011, a typical workday saw approximately CAN$2.4 million in Autopac claims, and 1,109 reported Autopac claims.

Vehicle registration plate lawsuits
In 2019, MPI was a defendant in two lawsuits financed by the Justice Centre for Constitutional Freedoms. The first challenged the revocation of an "ASIMIL8" license plate on the basis of a single complaint. Its owner, Nicholas Troller, testified that the plate was a reference to Star Trek. The second aimed to reinstate an "NDN CAR" license plate, previously issued to Bruce Spence to celebrate his "Indian" heritage.

See also
Insurance Corporation of British Columbia
Saskatchewan Government Insurance
State monopoly

External links

Manitoba Public Insurance profile on ZipperPages.ca

References

Financial services companies established in 1971
1971 establishments in Manitoba
Crown corporations of Manitoba
Companies based in Winnipeg
Motor vehicle registration agencies
Government-owned insurance companies of Canada

Financial services companies based in Manitoba